Chill: Black Morn Manor is a 1985 board game published by Pacesetter Ltd.

Gameplay
Chill: Black Morn Manor is a horror boardgame in which the players build the board as they play, and will face one of ten different possible creatures.

Reception
Paul Mason reviewed Chill: Black Morn Manor for White Dwarf #69, giving it an overall rating of 8 out of 10, and stated that "A little more explanation, with examples, would have been particularly useful. Still, the game involved a fair measure of strategy, particularly in the placing of tiles."

Matt Williams reviewed Black Morn Manor for Imagine magazine, and stated that "The rules, only four sides long, are written with a dry, black humour. However they are not as clear as they are concise. The order of card play Is ill-explained, with the rules contradicting instructions on most cards. Further, as the rules stand, the haunted room may never enter play; thus the game may last forever. Both these points have intuitive solutions, but mar what is otherwise an enjoyable game."

Kevin Ross reviewed Chill: Black Morn Manor in Space Gamer No. 76. Ross commented that "This is a tough genre to work in, especially in the area of boardgames [...] Pacesetter has done a pretty reasonable job with Black Morn Manor, and so far it appears to be the best of the horror boardgames."

Reviews
Different Worlds #44
 Casus Belli #39 (Aug 1987)
Jeux & Stratégie #46

References

External links
Review in Games

Board games introduced in 1985
Chill (role-playing game)
Pacesetter games